Daniel Mallory is the name of:

Dan Mallory, an American author who writes under the pseudonym A.J. Finn
Daniel M. Lavery, American humorist, fiction writer and advice columnist
D. Mallory Stephens, American politician